Megobrium is a monotypic beetle genus in the family Cerambycidae. Its only species, Megobrium edwardsii, was described by John Lawrence LeConte in 1873. It is found in the US state of California.

References

Hyboderini
Beetles described in 1873
Monotypic beetle genera